Close to Home is an American crime drama television series co-produced by Warner Bros. Television and Jerry Bruckheimer Television for CBS. While in pre-production the series was known as American Crime. It first aired from October 4, 2005, to November 12, 2007, and starred actress Jennifer Finnigan as Annabeth Chase, a Deputy Prosecutor for Marion County, Indiana (which contains Indianapolis). Created by Jim Leonard, the series was primarily filmed in Southern California. The score composer was Michael A. Levine.

On November 17, 2007, CBS canceled the series after two seasons.

Plot 

Annabeth Chase is a criminal prosecutor with a near perfect conviction record. Throughout the series, she lost only three cases. In Season 1, Episode 21 "David and Goliath", Chase tried a case against a professional baseball player, who killed his pregnant girlfriend. His not guilty verdict was attributed to his fame. Chase lost the case of a man prosecuted for a rape he committed 11 years prior, in Season 2, Episode 18, "Making Amends." In this case the victim was unable to recall the assault, as she unknowingly ingested Rohypnol, known as "The Date Rape Drug", which causes amnesia. In Season 2, Episode 21, "Drink the Cup", Chase was unable to convict a corrupt cop named Veeder of the murder of a fellow police officer. In the following episode she successfully tried Veeder for the murder of a young girl he exploited.

She is married to a construction worker, Jack Chase (Christian Kane), and has an infant daughter, Hailey Chase. The show revolves around her balancing her career and family life, as a prosecutor in the city of Indianapolis.

First season 
In the pilot episode, Chase returns from a 12-week maternity leave to find herself with a new boss, Maureen Scofield (Kimberly Elise), who has been promoted instead of her. Maureen is a no-nonsense, workaholic woman who admires Chase's dedication to her family and her personal life. Above her is County Prosecutor Steve Sharpe (John Carroll Lynch). Chase wins the first case she prosecutes upon her return to work: an abusive husband who is sentenced to 25 years in prison without parole.

Second season 
Annabeth returns to work four months after her husband was killed by a drunk driver in the first-season finale. Annabeth's coming to terms with her husband's death, her grief, and her struggle to return to normalcy, coupled with the guilt and trials of being a single parent, are recurring themes throughout the season.

Annabeth and Maureen also face a new boss, Chief Deputy Prosecutor James Conlon (David James Elliott), who has just arrived from New York, and whose methods appear to the two prosecutors to be too forceful and sometimes unethical.

Near the end of the season, Conlon attempts an attorney general campaign which is derailed as police corruption is discovered, resulting in several prosecutions. Scofield is assassinated as a result of these prosecutions. The season (and series) ends with Chase successfully prosecuting Scofield's assassin.

Cast 
 Jennifer Finnigan as Annabeth Chase
 Kimberly Elise as Maureen Scofield
 Christian Kane as Jack Chase (season 1)
 John Carroll Lynch as Steve Sharpe (season 1)
 Jon Seda as Ray Blackwell (season 2)
 Cress Williams as Detective Ed Williams (season 2)
 David James Elliott as James Conlon (season 2)
 Jessica Chastain as Casey Wirth
 Bruce Davison as Defense Attorney Doug Hellman
 Barry Shabaka Henley as Detective Lou Drummer
 Scott Caudill as Michael Hale (season 1)
 McKinley Freeman as William Harding (season 1)

U.S. Nielsen Ratings 

Despite earning high ratings for what is perceived as the Friday night death slot and ranking higher than most of its competition in the same slot, the show was still cancelled after only 2 seasons.

International broadcasting

References

External links 
 

2000s American crime drama television series
2005 American television series debuts
2007 American television series endings
2000s American legal television series
CBS original programming
English-language television shows
Television series by Warner Bros. Television Studios
Television shows set in Indianapolis
Indiana law
Television series about prosecutors